Nephopterix bicolorella is a species of snout moth in the genus Nephopterix. It was described by John Henry Leech in 1889. It is found in Japan and Korea.

The larvae feed on Populus and Salix species.

References

Moths described in 1889
Phycitini
Moths of Japan